The Bayan Shireh Formation (also known as Baynshiree/Baynshire, Baynshirenskaya Svita or Baysheen Shireh) is a geological formation in Mongolia, that dates to the Cretaceous period. It was first described and established by Vasiliev et al. 1959.

Description 
The Bayan Shireh Formation is primarily composed by varicoloured claystones and sandstones with calcareous concretions and characterized by grey mudstones and yellowish-brown medium grained sandstones. The Baynshire and Burkhant localities are mainly composed by mudstone, siltstone, sandstone, and conglomerates, with most of their sedimentation being fluvial. The environments that were present on the Bayan Shireh Formation consisted mainly on semi-arid climates with large water bodies, such as rivers or lakes. Although it is considered to be partially lacustrine, largescale cross-stratification in many of the sandstone layers at the Baynshire locality seem to indicate that a large meandering fluvial system was present. It has been implied that during the late Bayan Shirehnian times, large rivers with direct connections to the sea drained a prominent part of the eastern Gobi region.

Stratigraphy 
According to Jerzykiewicz and Russell, the Bayan Shireh Formation can be divided into 2 informal units: upper and lower beds. Danilov and colleagues have suggested that the lower beds are Cenomanian to early Turonian, and the upper beds are late Turonian to Santonian in age. While the lower beds are composed by extensive conglomerate that indicates the ancient presence of very active rivers, the upper beds are mainly composed by mudstone and claystone that is interbedded by sandstone, indicating again, the presence of rivers but also lakes and other water bodies.

Based on comparisons with other formations, Jerzykiewicz and Russell suggested that the Bayan Shireh paleofauna seems to correspond best with the Turonian through early Campanian stages of the Late Cretaceous, about 93 to 80 million years ago. However, examination of the magnetostratigraphy of the formation indicates that the entire Bayan Shireh lies within the Cretaceous Long Normal, which lasted only until the end of the Santonian stage, giving a possible Cenomanian through Late Santonian age, between 98 and 83 million years ago. In 2012, Averianov and Sues re-examined many formations from the Gobi Desert and using biostratigraphic occurrences and previous dating, the Bayan Shireh Formation was considered to be Cenomanian to Santonian in age. The lower beds dating to 98 million and 90 million years ago (early Cenomanian to late Turonian), and the upper beds dating to 90 million and 83 million years ago (late Turonian to late Santonian). Calcite U–Pb measurements performed by Kurumada and colleagues in 2020 have estimated the exact age of the Bayan Shireh Formation from 102–86 Ma, based on dates obtained of 95.9 ± 6.0 Ma and 89.6 ± 4.0 Ma.

Correlations 
A potential correlation between the Iren Dabasu Formation has been long suggested by most authors, mainly based on the highly similar vertebrate assemblages. However, Van Itterbeeck et al. 2005 argued against this correlation concluding that instead, the Iren Dabasu Formation was coeval with the younger Nemegt Formation based on the charophyte and ostracode assemblages; therefore, these formations were dated to the Late Campanian-Early Maastrichtian. Averianov and Sues instead proposed a correlation between the Bayan Shireh, Iren Dabasu and Bissekty formations. In 2015, Tsuihiji and team found the Iren Dabasu-Nemegt correlation to be inconsistent since the microfossil assemblages used by Van Itterbeeck and colleagues were not restricted to the Maastrichtian period and the similarities between these assemblages were most probably due to a similar deposition and climate settings.

Paleobiota of the Bayan Shireh Formation
In terms of biodiversity, therizinosaurs and turtles were the most abundant vertebrates across the formation, as evidenced on numerous remains. Nevertheless, hadrosauroids were fairly abundant too, particularly at the Baynshire locality with numerous remains unearthed from this area and a new unnamed hadrosauroid. In addition, most specimens of Gobihadros come from this locality. Also, niche partitioning has been reported within the therizinosaurids Erlikosaurus and Segnosaurus, and the ankylosaurs Talarurus and Tsagantegia. Mammals however, are extremely uncommon; Tsagandelta is the only mammal described so far. Besides vertebrate fossils, abundant fossil fruits have been collected from the Bor Guvé and Khara Khutul localities and they are especially abundant at Bor Guvé. Although they resemble Abelmoschus esculentus their taxonomic position remains unclear and further examination is required.

Crocodylomorphs

Fish

Flora

Mammals

Pterosaurs

Turtles

Dinosaurs

Ankylosaurids

Ceratopsians

Dromaeosaurids

Hadrosaurs

Ornithomimosaurs

Oviraptorosaurs

Pachycephalosaurs

Sauropods

Therizinosaurs

Troodontids

Tyrannosaurs

See also 
 List of dinosaur-bearing rock formations
 List of Asian dinosaurs
 Laurasia
 Geology of Mongolia
 Cretaceous Mongolia

References 

Geologic formations of Mongolia
Upper Cretaceous Series of Asia
Cenomanian Stage
Turonian Stage
Coniacian Stage
Santonian Stage
Sandstone formations
Shale formations
Fluvial deposits
Lacustrine deposits
Ichnofossiliferous formations
Ooliferous formations
Fossiliferous stratigraphic units of Asia
Paleontology in Mongolia